Valentin Alfredovich Franke (born 16 February 1926) is a Soviet—Russian theoretical physicist, D. Sc., retired professor of the High Energy & Elementary Particle Physics Department of Saint Petersburg State University.

Biography 
V. A. Franke graduated from Kyiv Polytechnic Institute in 1949. After that he was distributed to a power plant in Amur Oblast, Russian Far East. In 1954 he externally graduated from Leningrad State University and then worked in Institute of Labor Protection in Leningrad.

In 1962 V. A. Franke joined the physical faculty of LSU. He obtained his PhD under the supervision of Yury Novozhilov in 1965 and was habilitated in 1984. He was a professor of High Energy & Elementary Particle Physics Department until his retirement in 2020.

Scientific and educational activity 
V. A. Franke is working in the fields of elementary particle physics, quantum mechanics and theory of gravitation. He wrote more than 70 papers on these topics.

In 1976 V. A. Franke obtained the general form of the renowned master equation for the evolution of density matrix. This equation was derived independently and simultaneously by V. A. Franke, G. Lindblad and V. Gorini, A. Kossakowski and E. C. G. Sudarshan (see ). FGKLS (Franke-Gorini-Kossakowski-Lindblad-Sudarshan) equation plays an important role in the description of open quantum systems and the quantum measurement theory. V. A. Franke himself considered this equation as a natural generalisation of standard quantum mechanics, whose validity has to be proven experimentally.

Since 1981 V. A. Franke and his colleagues have been working on the light front quantization of the Yang—Mills theory. This approach proves itself useful in non-perturbative description of quantum chromodynamics.

After the death of his long-time friend and colleague, Yuri Yappa, V. A. Franke had completed and edited his unfinished monograph on the spinor theory.

References 

Soviet physicists
Russian physicists
Theoretical physicists

1926 births
Living people